Aleksandar Ivanovski (Macedonian:Александар Ивановски) is a Macedonian lawyer and academic, who serves as director with CFE Tax Advisers Europe.
Ivanovski previously worked as tax inspector.

He introduced the phrase “grey zone” used in European tax policy.

European tax policy

Ivanovski’s academic research is centered around tax and EU State aid rules, specifically the way State aid rules apply to individual tax deals by national authorities.
He is a frequent commentator on European tax rulings, on VAT and tax fraud as well as questions of tax transparency, such as :de:Public Country-by-Country-Reporting.
Advising on the prospective accession of his home country North Macedonia to the EU, Ivanovski also insisted on the importance of transparency in providing state subsidies to companies and on committing to sustainable investment policies.

Ethics for tax advisors
Ivanovski is a member of the European Commission Platform for Tax Good Governance, as independent expert on tax policy. He represents CFE Tax Advisers Europe in discussions on sustainable green transition.

In 2022, Ivanovski coined the phrase “grey zone” in the conversation on the need to regulate the tax advisors’ profession. He put forward that it would not be sufficient for the European Union to outlaw blatantly illegal misconduct because tax planning takes place in such grey zones. Ivanovski raised the question of important national differences within the EU in the attitude of citizens to tax.
He has been advocating in favor of ethical standards to be set for the tax advisors’ profession and to be included in the university program forming tax advisors.

References

Living people
Macedonian people
Macedonian lawyers
Tax lawyers
European Union tax law
Year of birth missing (living people)